Trapania is  a genus of sea slugs, specifically dorid nudibranchs, marine gastropod molluscs in the family Goniodorididae.

Description
The genus Trapania is distinguished from other goniodorid nudibranchs by the possession of two pairs of lateral papillae which arise from the remnant of the pallial margin and curve backwards parallel with the main body axis. One pair arises just outside the rhinophores and the other just outside the gill cluster. A pair of prominent oral tentacles are attached to the front of the head.

Species 
Species within the genus Trapania include:

 Trapania africana Edmunds, 2009
 Trapania armilla Gosliner & Fahey, 2008
 Trapania aurata Rudman, 1987
 Trapania aureopunctata Rudman, 1987
 Trapania bajamarensis Moro & Ortea, 2015
 Trapania benni Rudman, 1987
 Trapania bonellenae Valdés, 2009
 Trapania brunnea Rudman, 1987
 Trapania caerulea Gosliner & Fahey, 2008
 Trapania canaria Ortea & Moro, 2009
 Trapania circinata Gosliner & Fahey, 2008
 Trapania cirrita Gosliner & Fahey, 2008
 Trapania dalva Ev. Marcus, 1972
 Trapania darvelli Rudman, 1987
 Trapania darwini Gosliner & Fahey, 2008
 Trapania euryeia Gosliner & Fahey, 2008
 Trapania fusca (Lafont, 1874) - type species, originally described as Drepania fusca Lafont, 1874
 Trapania gibbera Gosliner & Fahey, 2008
 Trapania goddardi Hermosillo & Valdés, 2004
 Trapania goslineri Millen & Bertsch, 2000
 Trapania graeffei (Bergh, 1880) - possibly a synonym of Trapania fusca
 Trapania hispalensis Cervera & Garcia-Gomez, 1989
 Trapania inbiotica Camacho-Garcia & Ortea, 2000
 Trapania japonica (Baba, 1935)
 Trapania lineata Haefelfinger, 1960
 Trapania luquei Ortea, 1989
 Trapania maculata Haefelfinger, 1960
 Trapania maringa Er. Marcus, 1957
 Trapania melaina Gosliner & Fahey, 2008
 Trapania miltabrancha Gosliner & Fahey, 2008
 Trapania naeva Gosliner & Fahey, 2008
 Trapania nebula Gosliner & Fahey, 2008
 Trapania orteai Garcia-Gomez & Cervera in Cervera & Garcia-Gomez, 1989
 Trapania pallida Kress, 1968
 Trapania palmula Gosliner & Fahey, 2008
 Trapania reticulata Rudman, 1987
 Trapania rocheae Cetra & Roche, 2019
 Trapania rudmani M. C. Miller, 1981
 Trapania safracornia Fahey, 2004
 Trapania sanctipetrensis Cervera, Garcia-Gomez & Megina, 2000
 Trapania scurra Gosliner & Fahey, 2008
 Trapania squama Gosliner & Fahey, 2008
 Trapania tartanella (H. von Ihering, 1886)
 Trapania toddi Rudman, 1987
 Trapania tora Gosliner & Fahey, 2008
 Trapania velox (Cockerell, 1901)
 Trapania vitta Gosliner & Fahey, 2008

Gallery

References 

Goniodorididae
Taxa named by Alice Pruvot-Fol
Gastropod genera